Quiz is a British clothing business founded in 1993 in Scotland. In 2017, it had more than 275 shops in the United Kingdom and more than fifty shops in other parts of Europe and Asia.

In 2017 the company became public and floated on the London Stock Exchange. Its chairman is Peter Cowgill. In 2017, it was valued at £245 million.

In June 2020, Quiz announced plans to put its 82 UK and Ireland branches into administration before buying them back, allowing it to renegotiate rents. The move meant 93 jobs would be cut.

References

Clothing companies of Scotland
Clothing companies of the United Kingdom
1993 establishments in the United Kingdom